Tucma is a genus of flies belonging to the family Lesser Dung flies from Argentina.

Species
L. fritzi Marshall, 1996
L. tucumana Mourguès-Schurter, 1987

References

Sphaeroceridae
Diptera of South America
Brachycera genera